George Michael Harper (born 5 December 1988), is an American born English cricketer.  Harper is a right-handed batsman who bowls left-arm medium-fast.  He was born in Minnesota and educated at Harrow School, before undertaking studies at Durham University and Potchefstroom University.

Harper joined Buckinghamshire in 2008, making his Minor Counties Championship debut against Cumberland.  He has made 13 further appearances for the county in that competition and 4 MCCA Knockout Trophy matches.  Harper made his first-class debut for Loughborough UCCE against Warwickshire in 2009 at The Racecourse, Durham.  On debut he made a pair, but did take 4 wickets in the Warwickshire first-innings.  He played a further two first-class fixtures in 2010, against Nottinghamshire and Durham.  In his three first-class matches, he took 6 wickets at a bowling average of 49.50, with best figures 4/49.

References

External links
George Harper at ESPNcricinfo
George Harper at CricketArchive

1988 births
Living people
American people of British descent
Sportspeople from Minnesota
People educated at Harrow School
North-West University alumni
English cricketers
Buckinghamshire cricketers
Durham MCCU cricketers
Alumni of Hatfield College, Durham